Jungdoo Yang (born 1991) is a South Korean swimmer. On August 2, 2013, at the 2013 World Aquatics Championships in the Men's 50 metre freestyle event, Jungdoo Yang swam in the time of 22.48 to set the South Korean record.

References

http://www.omegatiming.com/File/Download?id=00010D020100000000FFFFFFFFFFFF02

1991 births
Living people
South Korean male freestyle swimmers
Asian Games medalists in swimming
Swimmers at the 2014 Asian Games
Medalists at the 2014 Asian Games
Asian Games bronze medalists for South Korea
21st-century South Korean people